Hastings United may refer to:
Hastings United F.C., a football club from Hastings, Sussex, England
Hastings United F.C. (1948), an earlier Sussex club
Hastings United AFC, a football club from Hastings, New Zealand